Winter Carnival is a 1939 comedy-drama film directed by Charles Reisner and starring Ann Sheridan, Richard Carlson and Helen Parrish.  Jill Baxter returns to her college for the annual Winter Carnival and falls in love with an old boyfriend.

Budd Schulberg and F. Scott Fitzgerald, among others worked on the script, an experience that led to Schulberg's novel The Disenchanted.

Plot
Publicity-loving heiress Jill Baxter (Ann Sheridan) returns to Dartmouth College for its Winter Carnival. Years earlier, she had been named Queen of the Carnival. Now, after a divorce from her exotic husband, she revisits Hanover, New Hampshire and reunites with the boyfriend (Richard Carlson), now a tweedy professor, that she had dumped for the husband. They flirt and re-find love on the ski slopes and at the parties of the celebration; meanwhile, her young sister hopes to be chosen as carnival queen, Jill's own title while at college.

Cast

Reception
Winter Carnival recorded a loss of $33,696.

References

External links
Winter Carnival at IMDb
Winter Carnival at TCMDB

1939 films
1939 comedy-drama films
American comedy-drama films
Films produced by Walter Wanger
American black-and-white films
Films directed by Charles Reisner
United Artists films
Films scored by Werner Janssen
1930s English-language films
1930s American films
Films with screenplays by Maurice Rapf